Cycle five of Suomen huippumalli haussa began airing on 3 September 2012 at 20.00 on the Finnish channel Nelonen. The winner of the competition was 22-year-old Meri Ikonen who won a modeling contract with Paparazzi Model Management, a spread in Finnish Elle, the chance to become the new spokesperson for Max Factor and a trip to a wished capital in Iceland.

Episode summaries

Episode 1
Original airdate: 3 September 2012

Casting episode.

Episode 2
Original airdate: 10 September 2012

The 11 girls arrive at the house and head to the Blistek Ad photo shoot.
At panel, Viivi got praised for her surprisingly good photograph, but Nelli-Kaneli and Vilma struggled to deliver a decent photo, and get in the bottom two. Anne tells them that they're both save, but need to step up their game.

First call-out: Viivi Luopa
Bottom two: Nelli-Kaneli Wasenius & Vilma Karjalainen
Eliminated: None

Episode 3
Original airdate: 17 September 2012

At the house, Nelli-Kaneli doubts her place in the competition. The girls do a Kalevara Jewellery ad.
At panel, Sanna and Matleena had stellar photos. Before Anne wants to call out the best model of the week, Nelli-Kaneli interrupts her and tells her that she wants to quit the competition due to her lack of desire regardless of taking a decent photo. Malla and Nevena land in the bottom two, Nevena is eliminated for being too versatile. Later, Anne tells that the Girls go to Iceland.

Quit: Nelli-Kaneli Wasenius
First call-out: Sanna Takalampi
Bottom two: Malla Hyytiäinen & Nevena Ek
Eliminated: Nevena Ek

Episode 4
Original airdate: 24 September 2012

The girls head to Iceland to their photo shoot. The panel was removed for this episode in Iceland at a lake. Annika surprises the judges with a stellar photo; Meri and Malla land in the bottom two for having a weak photo. In the end, the judges felt that Meri had more potential, and Malla was sent home.
First call-out: Annika Åkerfeld
Bottom two: Malla Hyytiäinen & Meri Ikonen
Eliminated: Malla Hyytiäinen

Episode 5
Original airdate: 1 October 2012

Quite upset about the elimination, the girls fly back to Finland for their next shoot. The brief was to show happiness. Although Katja brought positive energy, she couldn't deliver a decent shot, same as Sanna. Both land in the Bottom two; the judges felt Sanna had still more potential than Katja, and Katja was sent home.

First call-out: Matleena Helander
Bottom two: Katja Soisalo & Sanna Takalampi
Eliminated: Katja Soisalo

Episode 6
Original airdate: 8 October 2012

The girls do for their first time an edgy shooting. Meri received the most praise, giving her best photo of the week. Vilma and Viivi are the last to stand; Vilma for not giving enough, and Viivi for not showing any kind of desire to stay. In the end, the judges felt Vilma had shown enough, and she was sent packing.

First call-out: Meri Ikonen
Bottom two: Viivi Luopa & Vilma Karjalainen
Eliminated: Vilma Karjalainen

Episode 7
Original airdate: 15 October 2012

At the photo shoot, the girls do an ad for lingerie, where Annika excelled. Sanna and Viivi are once again the last two standing; Sanna for having a weak photograph, and Viivi for still not showing desire. In the end, Viivi's photo was deemed better and Sanna became the sixth girl to leave the competition.

First call-out: Annika Åkerfeld
Bottom two: Sanna Takalampi & Viivi Luopa
Eliminated: Sanna Takalampi

Episode 8
Original airdate: 22 October 2012

The final five does a high photo shoot, where they have to portray gods. Meri showed once again a powerful shot, and gets picture of the week for a second time. Polina and Viivi struggled, but with being the third consecutive time in the bottom two, Viivi was eliminated.
First call-out: Meri Ikonen
Bottom two: Polina Hiekkala & Viivi Luopa
Eliminated: Viivi Luopa

Episode 9
Original airdate: 29 October 2012

The final four does an ad for Clark shoes. Matleena excelled once again and got picture of the week. Meri and Annika land in the bottom two, Meri for her second time. The judges deemed Meri to be more ready than Annika; ultimately Meri was a part of the final three, and Annika was sent home.

First call-out: Matleena Helander
Bottom two: Annika Åkerfeld & Meri Ikonen
Eliminated: Annika Åkerfeld

Episode 10
Original airdate: 5 November 2012

Eliminated: None

Episode 11
Original airdate: 12 November 2012

Eliminated: None

Episode 12
Original airdate: 19 November 2012

The last three girls, Meri, Matleena and Polina do a fashion show. The relatives come to watch the show. During final deliberation, Anne looks at every girl's performance and amendment. She compares; Matleena who hadn't stood one single time in the bottom two, Meri who made the biggest improvement, and Polina who has a funny personality and gets booked for that. In the end, Meri was selected to be the fifth winner of Finland's Next Top Model.

Final three: Matleena Helander, Meri Ikonen & Polina Hiekkala
Finland's Next Top Model: Meri Ikonen

Contestants
(Ages stated are at start of contest)

Summaries

Call-out order

 The contestant was part of a non-elimination bottom two
 The contestant withdrew from the competition
 The contestant was eliminated
 The contestant won the competition

 In Episode 1, the group of semi-finalists was whittled down to 10 finalists. Out of the four girls eliminated (Leena, Malla, Noora and Ruut), Malla was voted as the eleventh finalist by the public, joining the competition the following episode.
 In Episode 3, Nelli-Kaneli quit the competition before the elimination.  
 In Episodes 10 and 11, there was no elimination.

Photo shoot guide
Episode 1 photo shoots: Promotional shots; B&W beauty shots (casting)  
Episode 2 photo shoot:  Blistex ads
Episode 3 photo shoot: Kalevala jewelry ads
Episode 4 photo shoot: Cailap hair accessories 
Episode 5 photo shoot: Sonera Buddy campaign
Episode 6 photo shoot: TRESemmé campaign
Episode 7 photo shoot: Change lingerie
Episode 8 photo shoot: Goddesses on a rooftop 
Episode 9 photo shoot: Clarks shoe ads
Episode 10 photo shoot: Fida campaign pictures
Episode 11 photo shoot: Cosmopolitan
Episode 12 photo shoot: Max Factor ads

References

External links
Nelonen homepage (in English)

2012 Finnish television seasons
Suomen huippumalli haussa

fi:Suomen huippumalli haussa